The Union des artistes (UDA; literally "Union of Artists") is a Quebec-based labour organization representing stage, television, radio, and film performers in French-language media in Canada. (The English-language labour organization is the Alliance of Canadian Cinema, Television and Radio Artists.) It represents over 6,900 members and is affiliated with the International Federation of Actors (FIA).

The UDA was founded in 1937 by the singer René Bertrand. It has been recognized under Quebec law since 1987 and under federal law since 1992.

Presidents

 1937–1939: René Bertrand
 1939–1941: Eddy Beaudry
 1941–1954: 
 1954–1955: Louis Bélanger
 1955–1957: 
 1957–1960: Jean Duceppe
 1960–1962: 
 1962–1966: 
 1966–1972: Jean-Paul Jeannotte
 1972–1974: 
 1974–1975: 
 1975–1980: Robert Rivard
 1980–1983: 
 1983–1984: 
 1984–1985: Nicole Picard
 1985–1997: Serge Turgeon
 1997–2007: Pierre Curzi
 2007–2013: Raymond Legault
 2013–present:

External links

  
 Union des Artistes at the  Encyclopedia of Canadian Theatre

1937 establishments in Canada
Actors' trade unions
Entertainment industry unions
Organizations based in Montreal
Trade unions in Canada
Trade unions in Quebec